Philip Hone (October 25, 1780 – May 5, 1851) was Mayor of New York City from 1826 to 1827.  He was most notable for a detailed diary he kept from 1828 until the time of his death in 1851, which is said to be the most extensive and detailed history on the first half of 19th-century America.

Early life
Hone was born in New York City on October 25, 1780. He was the son of Philip Hone (1743–1798), a German immigrant carpenter, and Esther (née Bourdet) Hone (1742–1798).

Career
Hone first began working in the auction business, which made him wealthy.  He was also a successful merchant and a founder of the Mercantile Library Association and he was the first president of the Delaware and Hudson Canal Company in 1825 and 1826.

He became a man of great prominence in New York society for his wealth, sophistication, extensive travel and good taste, and was good friends with most of the political, artistic and scientific leaders of his day. Most notable among them were: Washington Irving, Samuel Morse, Daniel Webster, John Jacob Astor and U.S. Presidents John Quincy Adams and Martin Van Buren.

Hone's diary records not only his society engagements and the major events and spectacles in the city in the first half of the century, but also his view of a changing city: his disapproval of Andrew Jackson; the disconcerting effects of the city's constant construction; and his utter disgust with most Irish immigrants.

In 1827, he was elected into the National Academy of Design as an Honorary Academician. Hone lived in an elegant town house at 235 Broadway, opposite City Hall Park.  The site was later one of those purchased by F. W. Woolworth for construction of the Woolworth Building.

Political career
Originally a Federalist, he was elected mayor in 1826 and served one term.  He later became active in the Whig Party.

During the Zachary Taylor administration, he served as Naval Officer of the Port of New York.

Personal life
Hone was married to Catharine Dunscomb (1778–1850), the daughter of Daniel and Margaret Dunscomb.  Catherine's sister, Margaret Bradford Dunscomb, was married to Robert Swartwout, the military officer, merchant, alderman, and Navy agent.  Together, they were the parents of:

 Robert Swartwout Hone (1815–1898)
 Mary S. Hone (1814–1840), who married John Jones Schermerhorn (1806–1876), the son of Peter Schermerhorn and brother of William Colford Schermerhorn, in 1832.

Hone died in New York City on May 5, 1851. He was buried at Saint Mark's Church in-the-Bowery.

Legacy
Honesdale, Pennsylvania, is named in honor of Philip Hone, as is Hone Avenue in the Bronx.

Notes

External links

Diary of Philip Hone 1828–1851, Vol. 1 Cornell University Library Making of America Monographs  {Reprinted by}Cornell University Library Digital Collections
Diary of Philip Hone 1828–1851, Vol. 2 Cornell University Library Making of America Monographs  {Reprinted by}Cornell University Library Digital Collections

1780 births
1851 deaths
19th-century American memoirists
19th-century American politicians
19th-century American railroad executives
People from Manhattan
Mayors of New York City
New York (state) Federalists
New York (state) Whigs
Delaware and Hudson Railway
American diarists
American people of German descent